Namal Nawana (born 1970/1971) is an Australian businessman, and former chief executive (CEO) of Smith & Nephew plc, a British multinational medical equipment manufacturing company.

Early life
Nawana earned a bachelor's degree in Mechanical Engineering in 1992, and a Masters of Medical Science from the University of Adelaide in South Australia in 1995, and an MBA from the Henley Business School, UK, in 2000.

Career
Nawana was CEO of the medical diagnostics company Alere, from 2014 until April 2018, overseeing its 2017 sale to Abbott Laboratories. Subsequently, he took over from Olivier Bohuon as CEO of Smith & Nephew.
In October 2019, Smith & Nephew announced Nawana would stand down, reportedly "because his requests for higher pay, in line with the packages awarded by US medical device-makers, could not be met under UK corporate governance standards".

References

Living people
Australian chief executives
1970s births
University of Adelaide alumni
Alumni of the University of Reading